German submarine U-1110 was a Type VIIC/41 U-boat of Nazi Germany's Kriegsmarine during World War II.

She was ordered on 2 April 1942, and was laid down on 18 December 1943, at Nordseewerke, Emden, as yard number 232. She was launched on 21 July 1944, and commissioned under the command of Oberleutnant zur See Joachim-Werner Bach on 24 September 1944.

Design
German Type VIIC/41 submarines were preceded by the heavier Type VIIC submarines. U-1110 had a displacement of  when at the surface and  while submerged. She had two shafts and two  propellers.

U-1110 was fitted with five  torpedo tubes (four fitted at the bow and one at the stern), fourteen torpedoes or 26 TMA or TMB Naval mines, one  SK C/35 naval gun, (220 rounds), one  Flak M42 and two  C/30 anti-aircraft guns. The boat had a complement of between forty-four and fifty-two.

Service history
On 14 May 1945, U-1110 surrendered at List auf Sylt, Germany and was transferred on 23 June 1945, from Wilhelmshaven to Loch Ryan, Scotland. Of the 156 U-boats that eventually surrendered to the Allied forces at the end of the war, U-1110 was one of 116 selected to take part in Operation Deadlight. U-1110 was towed out and sank on 21 December 1945, by naval gunfire.

See also
 Battle of the Atlantic

References

Bibliography

German Type VIIC/41 submarines
U-boats commissioned in 1944
World War II submarines of Germany
1944 ships
Ships built in Emden
Maritime incidents in December 1945
World War II shipwrecks in the Atlantic Ocean
Operation Deadlight